Aethaloessa calidalis is a moth of the family Crambidae described by Achille Guenée in 1854. It is found throughout the Seychelles, South and South-East Asia, Australia and on many Pacific islands.

This moth figured on an 8-cent stamp of Tuvalu in 1980.

References

External links
 "Aethaloessa calidalis". Australian Moths Online. CSIRO. Retrieved March 8, 2018.

Spilomelinae
Moths described in 1854
Taxa named by Achille Guenée
Fauna of Seychelles
Moths of Asia
Moths of Australia
Moths of Oceania